In 1950, Billboard magazine published two charts covering the top-performing songs in the United States in rhythm and blues (R&B) and related African-American-oriented music genres: Best Selling Retail Rhythm & Blues Records and Most Played Juke Box Rhythm & Blues Records, based on sales in stores and plays in jukeboxes respectively.  The two charts are considered part of the lineage of the magazine's multimetric R&B chart launched in 1958, which since 2005 has been published under the title Hot R&B/Hip-Hop Songs.

In the issue of Billboard dated January 7, 1950, Louis Jordan and his Tympany Five topped both charts with "Saturday Night Fish Fry" (Parts I & II), which had experienced lengthy runs atop both listings in the last quarter of 1949 and added a single week to each tally in the new year before being displaced from the top spot of both charts by Larry Darnell's "For You My Love".  Jordan returned to number one later in the year with "Blue Light Boogie", his 18th and final number one.  Having first reached number one in 1943, Jordan was by far the most successful artist of the 1940s on Billboards R&B charts.  His tally of chart-toppers was a record which stood until the 1980s, and "Blue Light Boogie" took his total number of weeks at number one to 113, more than three times the figure achieved by any other act to this point and a record which stood in the 21st century.  Jordan's success fell away in the 1950s, but his music is considered to have been hugely influential on the development of both R&B and rock and roll.

In addition to Jordan, Johnny Otis and Ivory Joe Hunter each achieved multiple number ones in 1950.  Otis and his band topped the best sellers chart twice and the juke box listing three times; "Cupid's Boogie" missed the top spot on the former, peaking at number two.   Vocalist Little Esther, aged 14, received featured credit on all three of Otis's chart-toppers and Mel Walker on two.  Otis and his band spent 13 weeks atop the best sellers chart, the most achieved by any act.  On the juke box listing, Joe Liggins and his Honeydrippers had the highest total number of weeks at number one, also with 13 weeks.  Liggins's song "Pink Champagne" was the year's longest-running chart-topper on both listings, spending 13 non-consecutive weeks atop the juke box chart and 11 consecutive weeks in the peak position on the best sellers chart.  It was the second of two long-running number one for Liggins following 1945's "The Honeydripper", which spent a record-setting 18 weeks in the peak position, but by the end of 1951 his chart career was over.  Artists who reached number one for the first time in 1950 included Joe Morris and Percy Mayfield, both of whom reached the top spot with their first charting singles.  Another first-time chart-topper was Ruth Brown, whose single "Teardrops from My Eyes" was the final number one of 1950 on both charts.  Nat "King" Cole gained his first number one for six years when his Trio topped the juke box chart with "Mona Lisa", which achieved sufficient crossover success to also top Billboards pop charts, the only one of 1950's R&B number ones to achieve this feat.

Chart history

Notes
a.  Jordan's first 16 number ones occurred at a time when Billboard published only one R&B chart.  His final two number ones occurred during a period when the magazine published two charts and each topped both listings, but the figure of 113 weeks at number one does not double-count weeks when he topped both.

References

Works cited

1950
United States RandB
1950 in American music